Order of Freedom (Orden na slobodata) was the highest military decoration awarded in Yugoslavia, and the second highest Yugoslav state decoration after the Yugoslav Great Star. It was awarded to the commanders of large military units for skillful leadership and for the outstanding courage of the troops. It was awarded to both Yugoslavian and foreign military commanders, and was the most rarely awarded of all Yugoslavian orders, decorations, and medals, being awarded only 7 times before the breakup of Yugoslavia.

After the breakup of Yugoslavia, the Order of Freedom was awarded in Serbia and Montenegro.

History
The Order of Freedom was founded on 12 June 1945 and was awarded by the Presidium of the AVNOJ (later Presidium of the People's Assembly of Yugoslavia). The recipient could be nominated by the Federal Executive Council (Government) of Yugoslavia, Executive Council of one of the Republics, Federal Secretary for Foreign Affairs or Federal Secretary for Defense.

After the breakup of Yugoslavia, the union of Serbia and Montenegro (formally Federal Republic of Yugoslavia until 2003) continued to use some of the decorations of former Yugoslavia, among them the Order of Freedom. It was awarded by the President of FR Yugoslavia (later President of Serbia and Montenegro). It was the highest military decoration in FR Yugoslavia, and the third highest state decoration overall, after the Order of Yugoslavia and the Yugoslav Great Star.

Recipients
The Order was awarded a total of 9 times — 7 times in SFR Yugoslavia and 2 times in FR Yugoslavia (after the 1999 Kosovo War). The recipients were:

SFR Yugoslavia
  Josip Broz Tito — awarded in 1947
  Ivan Gošnjak — awarded in 1951
  Koča Popović  — awarded in 1951
  Georgy Zhukov — awarded in 1956
  Peko Dapčević — awarded in 1973
  Kosta Nađ — awarded in 1973
  Leonid Brezhnev — awarded in 1976

FR Yugoslavia
On 16 June 1999 the Order of Freedom was awarded to:
  Dragoljub Ojdanić
  Nebojša Pavković

See also
Orders, decorations, and medals of the Socialist Federal Republic of Yugoslavia
Orders and medals of Federal Republic of Yugoslavia

References

Orders, decorations, and medals of Yugoslavia
Awards established in 1945
1945 establishments in Yugoslavia